Guilinyang is a town within the Guilinyang Economic Development Zone, in Longhua District, Haikou, Hainan Province, China.

The main street has a single set of traffic lights at the main intersection, and acts as a thoroughfare between Lingshan, a town to the west, and other places to the east.

The main street has various companies such as phone shops, banks, et cetera. Near the main intersection, there is a market area of about one hectare. It contains a covered meat and vegetable market, surrounded by numerous small shops selling items ranging from clothing to hardware.

Adjacent to the market area is a hotel area, which includes several small hotels and restaurants.

Both the Hainan Normal University, Guilinyang Campus, and the still under-construction Haikou College of Economics, Guilinyang Campus, are located on the outskirts of the town.

Dozens of small and medium-sized factories, many of which produce pharmaceutical products, are also located in various locations throughout the town.

Improvements

During 2015 and 2016, as part of a province-wide initiative, the town as undergone improvements, particularly on its main road. This has included installation of more attractive building facades, and the installation of new sidewalks and landscaping features.

References

External links

Populated places in Hainan